Latha, commonly known as Latha Hamsalekha, is an Indian playback singer in Kannada. She is the wife of composer Hamsalekha. For her song Aa Arunodaya Chanda in the movie Arunodaya, Latha was awarded the Karnataka State Film Award for Best Female Playback Singer in 1999–2000.

Personal life 
Latha was born in Bangalore to Mitrananda Kumar and Sharada. She married Hamsalekha and they have a son and two daughters.

Career 
Latha first became an orchestra singer in ‛Gaana Sharada’ troupe, owned by Hamsalekha's elder brother G. Balakrishna. Then started her career as playback singer through the hit song Nodamma Hudugi in the movie Premaloka in 1987. 
Most of her songs are recorded by Hamsalekha.
Some of her hit songs including "Hasiru Gajina Balegale" (Avane Nanna Ganda), "Kaveri Theeradalli Mungarige" (Chaitrada Premanjali), "Akaradalli Gulabi Rangide" (Anjada Gandu), "Collegegu Thanks" (Joot) and many.

Awards 
 2017 - Dr. Rajkumar Award by Raghavendra Chitravani Institution
 1999-2000 - Karnataka State Film Award for Best Female Playback Singer - Aa Arunodaya Chanda (Arunodaya)

Filmography

References

External links 
 

Indian women playback singers
Kannada playback singers
Living people
1957 births